Ecdysis is the moulting of the exoskeleton in arthropods and other animals.

Ecdysis may also refer to:

Ecdysis (album), an album by Miho Hatori

See also
 Ecdysiast, a euphemism for a striptease artist
 Moult (disambiguation)